The 1980–81 Bundesliga was the 18th season of the Bundesliga, West Germany's premier football league. It began on 15 August 1980 and ended on 13 June 1981. Bayern Munich were the defending champions.

Competition modus
Every team played two games against each other team, one at home and one away. Teams received two points for a win and one point for a draw. If two or more teams were tied on points, places were determined by goal difference and, if still tied, by goals scored. The team with the most points were crowned champions while the three teams with the fewest points were relegated to 2. Bundesliga.

Team changes to 1979–80
Hertha BSC, SV Werder Bremen and Eintracht Braunschweig were relegated to the 2. Bundesliga after finishing in the last three places. They were replaced by Arminia Bielefeld, winners of the 2. Bundesliga Northern Division, 1. FC Nürnberg, winners of the Southern Division and Karlsruher SC, who won a two-legged promotion play-off against Rot-Weiss Essen.

Season overview

Team overview

League table

Results

Top goalscorers
29 goals
  Karl-Heinz Rummenigge (FC Bayern Munich)

27 goals
  Manfred Burgsmüller (Borussia Dortmund)

19 goals
  Klaus Allofs (Fortuna Düsseldorf)

17 goals
  Paul Breitner (FC Bayern Munich)
  Horst Hrubesch (Hamburger SV)
  Dieter Müller (1. FC Köln)
  Kurt Pinkall (VfL Bochum)

16 goals
  Wilfried Hannes (Borussia Mönchengladbach)
  Arne Larsen Økland (Bayer 04 Leverkusen)
  Gerd-Volker Schock (Arminia Bielefeld)

Champion squad

References

External links
 DFB Bundesliga archive 1980/1981

Bundesliga seasons
1
Germany